Melevodopa (brand name Levomet) is a dopaminergic agent. It is the methyl ester of levodopa. It is used in tablet form as an effervescent prodrug with 250 times the water solubility of tablet levodopa.

See also 
 Etilevodopa

References 

Prodrugs
Dopamine agonists
Catecholamines
Carboxylate esters
Methyl esters
Phenylpropanoids